, provisional designation , is carbonaceous Zhongguo asteroid from the outermost regions of the asteroid belt, approximately  in diameter. It was discovered on 24 October 2000, by astronomers with Lincoln Near-Earth Asteroid Research at the Lincoln Laboratory's Experimental Test Site near Socorro, New Mexico, in the United States. The likely elongated C-type asteroid has a rotation period of 19.20 hours.

Orbit and classification 

 is a non-family asteroid from the main belt's background population, and a member of the small group of Zhongguo asteroids, located in the Hecuba gap and locked in a 2:1 mean-motion resonance with the gas giant Jupiter. Contrary to the nearby unstable Griqua group, the orbits of the Zhongguos are stable over half a billion years.

It orbits the Sun in the outer main-belt at a distance of 2.5–4.1 AU once every 6.04 years (2,206 days; semi-major axis of 3.32 AU). Its orbit has an eccentricity of 0.24 and an inclination of 0° with respect to the ecliptic. The body's observation arc begins with a precovery taken by Spacewatch in February 1996, more than 4 years prior to its official discovery observation at Socorro.

Physical characteristics 

 has been characterized as a carbonaceous C-type asteroid by Pan-STARRS large-scale survey.

Rotation period 

In January 2014, a rotational lightcurve of this asteroid was obtained from photometric observations in the R-band by astronomers at the Intermediate Palomar Transient Factory in California. Lightcurve analysis gave a rotation period of 19.20 hours with a high brightness amplitude of 0.70 magnitude, indicative of an elongated shape.

Diameter and albedo 

The Collaborative Asteroid Lightcurve Link assumes a standard albedo for carbonaceous asteroids of 0.057 and calculates a diameter of 4.87 kilometers based on an absolute magnitude of 15.29.

Numbering and naming 

This minor planet was numbered by the Minor Planet Center on 28 March 2002, after its orbit had sufficiently been secured. As of 2018, it has not been named.

References

External links 
 Asteroid Lightcurve Database (LCDB), query form (info )
 Discovery Circumstances: Numbered Minor Planets (35001)-(40000) – Minor Planet Center
 
 

038984
038984
038984
20001024